This is a list of division winners and playoff matches in the regionally organized Eccellenza 2006–2007.

Division winners

Regional playoffs

Rules
In the regional playoffs, each Regional Committee can decide its own rules to admit a single team to the national phase. In the 2006–07 season, Liguria, Trentino-Alto Adige/Südtirol, Veneto, Friuli-Venezia Giulia, Emilia-Romagna and Lazio opted not to organize any regional playoff, preferring instead to admit the runner-up team directly to the national phase, whereas all other regional committees organized playoffs between teams from second to fifth place, with the exception of Piedmont, that organized a playoff between only three teams (from second to fourth place).

Piedmont A

Playoff semifinals

|}
Playoff finals

|}

Piedmont B

Playoff semifinals

|}
Playoff finals

|}

Lombardy A

Preliminary playoff

|}
Playoff semifinals

|}
Playoff final

|}

Lombardy B

Playoff semifinals

|}
Playoff final

|}

Lombardy C

Playoff semifinals

|}
Playoff final

|}

Tuscany A

Playoff semifinals

|}
Playoff final

|}

Tuscany B

Playoff semifinals

|}
Playoff final

|}

Umbria

Playoff semifinals

|}
Playoff final

|}

Marche

Playoff semifinals

|}
Playoff final

|}

Abruzzo

Playoff semifinals

|}
Playoff final

|}

Molise

Playoff semifinals

|}
Playoff final

|}

Campania A

Playoff semifinals

|}
Playoff final

|}

Campania B

Playoff semifinals

|}
Playoff final

|}

Apulia

Playoff semifinals

|}
Playoff final

|}

Basilicata

Playoff semifinals

|}
Playoff final

|}

Calabria

Playoff semifinals

|}
Playoff final

|}

Sicily A

Playoff semifinals

|}
Playoff final

|}

Sicily B

Playoff semifinals

|}
Playoff final

|}

Sardinia

Playoff semifinals

|}
Playoff final

|}

(b) — Team who best placed in the regular season qualifies for the next round.

National playoffs

Rules
The national playoffs involved a total of 28 teams, respectively the regional playoff winners or the second-placed teams in case regional playoffs were not organized by the correspondent committee. A total of two two-legged rounds are played in order to fill the remaining seven Serie D spots.

First round
First leg: matches A to N on May 27, matches O to P on June 3
Second leg: matches A to N on June 3, matches O to P on June 10

|}

Second round
First leg: matches 1 to 5 on June 10; matches 6 & 7 on June 17
Second leg: matches 1 to 5 on June 17; matches 6 & 7 on June 24

|}

Notes and references

6
2007